Peter Teschner is an American film editor. He is best known as the editor of comedy films such as Road Trip, Dodgeball: A True Underdog Story, Borat, and Going the Distance.  Teschner is a 1980 graduate of Columbia College Chicago and in 2006 he was honored with the school's Alumni of the Year award for his Outstanding Contribution to a Field of Motion Picture Editing.

Filmography

Editorial department

Production manager

Producer

References

External links

Place of birth missing (living people)
Year of birth missing (living people)
Living people
American film editors